Cloonsheebane

Cloonsheebane is a townland in Leitrim. Its name derives from the Irish  , Cluain meaning "meadow," "Sí" meaning fairy, while "Bán" means white, and in this context it means clear or fallow. 

Cloonsheebane is part of Carrick-on-Shannon. The road from Carrick-on-Shannon to Cootehall passes through the townland. Neighbouring townlands are Cloonsheerevagh, Cartown, Ballynamoney, Townparks, Lisnagat, Portaneoght, and Hartley.

History

Townlands of County Leitrim
Carrick-on-Shannon